This is a list of the tallest known species of trees, as reflected by measurements of the tallest reliably-measured individual specimen. Although giant trees grow in both tropical and temperate regions, they are very restricted geographically and phylogenetically. All the known giant trees occur in mesic climates, and nearly all of them are found in three regions: western North America from California to British Columbia, Southeast Asia (especially Borneo) and southeastern Australia (especially Tasmania).

Tallest living individuals by species 
The following are the tallest reliably-measured specimens from the top species. This table contains information on all species for which at least one specimen has been reliably measured at 80 meters (262 feet) or taller.

Maximum limits of tree height 
Two main opposing forces affect a tree's height; one pushes it upward while the other holds it down. By analyzing the interplay between these forces in coast redwoods (Sequoia sempervirens), a team of biologists led by George Koch of Northern Arizona University calculated the theoretical maximum tree height or the point at which opposing forces balance out and a tree stops growing. This point lies somewhere between 122 and 130 m (400 and 426 feet). On the one hand, the researchers found, trees in forests "desire" to grow as tall as possible to overtake neighboring trees and reach stronger sunlight. On the other hand, gravity makes it more and more difficult to haul water upwards from the roots to the canopy as the tree grows, and leaves thus become smaller near the top. They discovered that despite the moistness of the ground far below, the leaves at the treetops struggle to get enough water, so they are effectively living in a constant drought. The difficulty of getting water so far up into the sky is what ultimately constrains growth. Other researchers have developed models of maximum height for Coast Douglas-fir (Pseudotsuga menziesii var. menziesii) trees that yield similar estimates of 109–138 meters (357–452 feet), a range that includes the height of the tallest reliably-measured historical (dead) specimen, a 126-meter tree.

Other claims of superlative height 
There are many historical and contemporary claims of superlative height for species beyond those listed in the table above. In most cases, these claims are not supported by detailed methodological documentation or drawn from scientific sources or official "big tree" registries.

The heights of the tallest trees in the world have been the subject of considerable dispute and much exaggeration. Modern verified measurements with laser rangefinders or with tape drop measurements made by tree climbers (such as those carried out by canopy researchers), have shown that some older tree height measurement methods are often unreliable, sometimes producing exaggerations of 5% to 15%  or more above the real height.

See also
List of individual trees
List of oldest trees
List of superlative trees
List of tallest buildings and structures

References

tallest
trees, tallest